Margaret Ann Barton (born 27 May 1926) is a British retired actress. She is best known for her role in the 1945 David Lean film Brief Encounter in which she played Beryl Walters, a girl who works in the railway station cafe.

Early career
Barton began acting in the theatre at the age of 12. Because she was small for her age, during World War II she portrayed children and young women. At 17 she appeared in Pink String and Sealing Wax at the Duke of York's Theatre and remembered performing while doodlebugs flew overhead. While on the West End stage she was spotted by David Lean and Noël Coward and cast for the part of Beryl in Brief Encounter. Her scenes were shot at Denham Film Studios and for other scenes she was invited by Lean to watch from behind the camera.

Postwar
After the war, Barton continued acting on stage, in film, and for television. She married Raymond James; their son, Michael, died of cancer at the age of 30, and his parents set up the Michael James Music Trust in his memory. Raymond James died in 2016, aged 93. Barton lives in Dorset, where she runs a tea room, and still receives many letters relating to Brief Encounter. On 30 August 2018, aged 92, she married Rob Cave, aged 91, in Wimborne. Their combined age of 183 was believed to make them Britain's oldest newlyweds.

Filmography

References

External links

1926 births
Living people
English film actresses
Actresses from London
People from Finsbury Park